Gerres filamentosus, the whipfin silver-biddy, flagfin mojarra or threadfin silver belly, is a fish native to the coastline of Africa and Madagascar east to Japan, Australia and New Caledonia.

References

Fish of Australia
Fish of Thailand
Fish described in 1829
Taxa named by Georges Cuvier
filamentosus